The Tulip System I is a 16-bit personal computer based on the Intel 8086 and made by Tulip Computers, formerly an import company for the Exidy Sorcerer, called Compudata Systems.

Its Motorola 6845-based video display controller could display 80×24 text in 8 different fonts for supporting different languages, including a (Videotex-based) font for 2×3 pseudo graphic symbols for displaying 160×72 pixel graphics in text mode.

The video display generator could also display graphics with a 384×288 or 768×288 (color) or 768×576 (monochrome) pixel resolution using its built-in NEC 7220 video display coprocessor, which had hardware supported drawing functions, with an advanced set of bit-block transfers it could do line generating, arc, circle, ellipse, ellipse arc, filled arc, filled circle, filled ellipse, filled elliptical arc and many other commands.

Its memory can be upgraded in units of 128 KB up to 896 KB (much more than the 640 KB of the original PC).

It included a SASI hard disk interface (a predecessor of the SCSI-standard) and was optionally delivered with a 5 MB or 10 MB hard disk. The floppy disk size was 400 KB (10 sectors, instead of 8 or 9 with the IBM PC) or 800 KB (80 tracks).

It runs at 8 MHz with a true 16-bit CPU, almost twice the speed of the IBM PC XT which was launched only a few months earlier in July 1983. It has the possibility to use an Intel 8087 math coprocessor, which increased the speed to > 200 kflops, which was near mainframe data at that time.

After initially using CP/M-86, it quickly switched to using generic MS-DOS 2.00. There was a rudimentary IBM BIOS-emulator, which allowed the user to use WordStar and a few other IBM-PC software, but Compudata B.V. shipped WordStar and some other software as adopted software for this computer. There was programming support by Compudata B.V. with MS-Basic, MS-Pascal and MS-Fortran.
On a private base, TeX and Turbo Pascal were ported to the Tulip System I.

References

External links
 Tulip I on web site of the Dutch Tulip association (in Dutch)
A user's personal experience with a Tulip System-I

IBM PC compatibles